is a Japanese curler from Karuizawa, Nagano. She is the second on the Chubu Electric Power curling team, which is skipped by Ikue Kitazawa. At the international level, she has represented Japan twice at the World Junior Curling Championships as well as the 2022 World Women's Curling Championship.

Career
At just twelve years old, Suzuki competed in her first Japan Curling Championships with her junior team of Ikue Kitazawa, Seina Nakajima, Eri Ogihara and Ayoko Tanimoto. Two years later, she returned to the championship, again with Nakajima, but with two new teammates in Ani Enami and Sae Yamamoto. At the national championship, Team Nakajima posted a 5–3 round robin record, qualifying them for the playoff round. They then lost the 3 vs. 4 game to Tori Koana and the bronze medal game to Ayumi Ogasawara, placing them fourth overall.

Nakajima aged out of juniors following the 2017–18 season and Ani Enami moved up to play skip for her team. The team was able to capture the 2018 Japan Junior Curling Championship title, qualifying them for the 2019 World Junior-B Curling Championships in January 2019 where they would need to place in the top three to secure a spot in the 2019 World Junior Curling Championships. At the event, the team went 7–2, winning the bronze medal game and securing their spot at the World Junior Championships. At the Worlds, the team struggled, finishing in ninth place overall with a 2–7 record. This finish meant that they would have to play in the B Championship in order to qualifying for the World Juniors the following year. During the 2019–20 season, her junior team, taken over by Sae Yamamoto, won the 2019 World Junior-B Curling Championships in December 2019, qualifying them once again for the 2020 World Junior Curling Championships. The team fared much better at the World Championship this time around, qualifying for the playoffs with a 5–4 record. They then lost in the semifinal to South Korea and in the bronze medal game to Russia, placing fourth at the event. Suzuki joined the Chubu Electric Power curling team, consisting of Seina Nakajima, Ikue Kitazawa, Chiaki Matsumura and Hasumi Ishigooka, initially for the 2020–21 season. However, after the COVID-19 pandemic cancelled the majority of the events during the season, the team began competing together for the 2021–22 season.

Team Nakajima finished third at the 2021 Hokkaido Bank Curling Classic. Because Team Fujisawa won the 2021 Japanese Olympic Curling Trials and were representing Japan at the 2022 Winter Olympics, a world championship trial was held between Chubu Electric Power, Fujikyu and Hokkaido Bank Fortius to determine who would represent Japan at the 2022 World Women's Curling Championship. Chubu Electric posted a 3–1 record in the qualifying round, earning them a spot in the best-of-three final against Yoshimura. After splitting the first two games, the Nakajima rink took one in the tenth end of the final game to earn the berth as Team Japan at the World Championship. The team altered their lineup for the World Championship, naming Ikue Kitazawa the new skip of the team. In Prince George, British Columbia, Canada for the Worlds, the Japanese team went 6–6 through the round robin, however, it was not enough to qualify for the playoff round, and they placed seventh.

Personal life
Suzuki is employed as an office worker.

Teams

References

External links

Living people
2001 births
People from Karuizawa, Nagano
Sportspeople from Yokohama
Japanese female curlers
Sportspeople from Nagano Prefecture
21st-century Japanese women